Giuseppina Tufano (born 19 June 1965) is an Italian basketball player. She competed in the women's tournament at the 1992 Summer Olympics and the 1996 Summer Olympics.

References

1965 births
Living people
Italian women's basketball players
Olympic basketball players of Italy
Basketball players at the 1992 Summer Olympics
Basketball players at the 1996 Summer Olympics
Sportspeople from Naples